McDermott is a census-designated place in western Rush Township, Scioto County, Ohio, United States. As of the 2010 census it had a population of 434.  It has a post office with the ZIP code 45652.

History
Platted on July 28, 1898, the community of McDermott is named after one of the area's earliest commercial ventures, McDermott Stone Company. A post office called McDermott has been in operation since 1898.

References

Census-designated places in Ohio
Census-designated places in Scioto County, Ohio